Guns and Kidneys is an unreleased Chinese black comedy film directed by Zhang Meng, and stars Wang Qianyuan, Huang Jingyu, Ivy Chen, Zhang Liang, and Zhang Lanxin. The film will be the first of its kind to introduce the combination of black humor with zombie elements into the Chinese film market. The film was expected to be released on 2019.

Plot
Amon attempted to drift back home to hide from debt, only to find creditors at his door.  Wounded, he fled into the wasteland and was rescued by Lao Fan.  Lao Fan own a small restaurant called Guns & Kidneys in an abandoned industrial area.  About 15 years ago, the area experienced an attempted at demolition, but due to the dissatisfied residents, the project was abandoned midway, leaving behind destitution.  Amon found that the people here are lively and tough, but numb because business is bleak.

Opportunities arises when a foreign film crew wanted an abandoned industrial area for filming.  As the residents look forward to the businesses that the new film could bring into the area, complications arrive when the demolition project revive and creditors close in on their chase.

Cast
 Wang Qianyuan as Lao Fan
 Huang Jingyu as Amon
 Ivy Chen as Xiao Chu
 Zhang Liang as Lao San
 Zhang Lanxin as Dong Feifei

Production

Filming
Principal photography on the film began on August 23, 2016 in Baotou, the largest industrial city in Inner Mongolia, China.

References

External links
 Guns and Kidneys Official Weibo Page 

Chinese black comedy films
Chinese comedy-drama films
Unreleased films
Films shot in Inner Mongolia
Mandarin-language films
Films directed by Zhang Meng